Amelie Posse-Brázdová (11 February 1884, in Stockholm – 3 March 1957) was a Swedish author. She is also known for her work against nazism during World War II.

Amelie Posse was the daughter of Count Fredrik Arvidsson Posse and Auda Gunhild Wennerberg. She was married to the criminal psychologist Andreas Bjerre in 1904–1912, with whom she had a son, Sören Christer Bjerre (1905-1967), who was declared insane in 1921 but eventually in adulthood became a journalist. Following her 1912 divorce from Bjerre, she married the Czech artist Oskar (nicknamed Oki) Brázda (1887–1977)  from 1915, and became the mother of Bohuslav (Slavo) 9/13/1916-1991;RAF pilot) & the artist Jan Brazda (12/4/1917-2012) with Brázda.

During her second marriage, she lived in the Vatican some 7 years,& then Czechoslovakia on the manor Líčkov. In 1938, she returned to Sweden after an order for her arrest had been issued by the Gestapo. In 1940, she was one of the founders of the discussionclub Tisdagsklubben ("The Tuesday Club") in Stockholm. It was formally a discussion-club about culture, but its true purpose was to work against the expansion of nazism in Sweden. The club was in fact inaugurated the same day Nazi Germany occupied Norway, the 9 April 1940. Tisdagsklubben was to be used as the center of the Swedish resistance movement in the case Sweden was ever occupied by Nazi Germany. Amelie Posse was, like other members of the club, listed in German records as "Untrustworthy Swedes".

A tiny museum with Amelie Posse memorabilia can be found at Örenäs slott, close to Posse's childhood home (torn down), near Landskrona in south Sweden.

Bibliography
Den oförlikneliga fångenskapen, 1931.
Den brokiga friheten, 1932.
Ned med vapnen! En kampsignal mot kriget, 1935.
Vidare, 1936.
I begynnelsen var ljuset, 1940.
Bygga upp, ej riva neder, 1942.
Mellan slagen, 1946.
Kring kunskapens träd, 1946.
Kunskapens träd i blom, 1946.
Åtskilligt kan nu sägas, 1949.
Minnenas park, 1954.
När järnridån föll över Prag, a book posthmously published in 1968. Barbro Alving edited the book before its publication.

Her work has been translated into English, Danish and Czech.

Sources
Bokholm, Rune, Tisdagsklubben. Om glömda antinazistiska sanningssägare i svenskt 30-40-tal, Atlantis förlag, Stockholm, 2001.
Levander, Hans, "Posse-Brázdová, Amelie", Svenska män och kvinnor 6, Albert Bonniers Förlag, Stockholm, 1949.
Lövgren, Britta, "Posse, Amelie", Svenskt Biografiskt Lexikon 143, red Göran Nilzén, Stockholm 1996.
Strömberg Krantz, Eva, En ande som hör jorden till: en bok om Amelie Posse, Carlsson, Stockholm, 2010.

Further reading

References

1884 births
1957 deaths
Women in World War II
Swedish people of World War II
Swedish countesses
Swedish expatriates in the Czech Republic
Writers from Stockholm
Swedish women writers
20th-century Swedish women